The M81 Group is a galaxy group in the constellations Ursa Major and Camelopardalis that includes the  galaxies Messier 81 and Messier 82, as well as several other galaxies with high apparent brightnesses.  The approximate center of the group is located at a distance of 3.6 Mpc, making it one of the nearest groups to the Local Group.  The group is estimated to have a total mass of (1.03 ± 0.17).
The M81 Group, the Local Group, and other nearby groups all lie within the Virgo Supercluster (i.e. the Local Supercluster).

Members

The table below lists galaxies that have been identified as associated with the M81 Group by I. D. Karachentsev.

Note that the object names used in the above table differ from the names used by Karachentsev.  NGC, IC, UGC, and PGC numbers have been used in many cases to allow for easier referencing.

Interactions within the group

Messier 81, Messier 82, and NGC 3077 are all strongly interacting with each other.  Observations of the 21-centimeter hydrogen line indicate how the galaxies are connected. 
The gravitational interactions have stripped some hydrogen gas away from all three galaxies, leading to the formation of filamentary gas structures within the group.  Bridges of neutral hydrogen have been shown to connect M81 with M82 and NGC 3077. Moreover, the interactions have also caused some interstellar gas to fall into the centers of Messier 82 and NGC 3077, which has led to strong starburst activity (or the formation of many stars) within the centers of these two galaxies. Computer simulations of tidal interactions have been used to show how the current structure of the group could have been created.

Gallery

See also
 UGC 5497

References

External links
 M81 Group @ SEDS
 M81 Group from An Atlas of The Universe

 
Virgo Supercluster
Galaxy clusters